Closterothrix is a genus of moths in the family Lasiocampidae. The genus was erected by Paul Mabille in 1879.

Species
Based on Afromoths:
Closterothrix bosei (Saalmüller, 1880)
Closterothrix bruncki De Lajonquière, 1974
Closterothrix diabolus (Hering, 1928)
Closterothrix fulvipuncta (Viette, 1962)
Closterothrix funebris De Lajonquière, 1970
Closterothrix gambeyi Mabille, 1879
Closterothrix goliath (Viette, 1962)
Closterothrix goudoti Viette, 1962
Closterothrix insularis Viette, 1962
Closterothrix leonina (Butler, 1882)
Closterothrix nigrosparsata Viette, 1962 
Closterothrix peyrierasi Viette, 1988
Closterothrix secernenda De Lajonquière, 1969
Closterothrix sikorae Aurivillius, 1909

External links

Lasiocampidae